Borland is a surname of Scottish origin. The Borland ancestors came to Scotland with the Normans in the 11th Century

Notable people with the surname include:

Adrian Borland (1957–1999), English singer
Albert Borland (1901–1961), South African cricketer
Billy Borland (1888–1915), Scottish footballer
Bruce Borland (1958–1999), American golf course designer
Carroll Borland (1914–1994), American professor
Charles Borland (contemporary), American actor
Charles Borland Jr. (1786–1852), American politician
Chris Borland (born 1990), American football player
Christine Borland (born 1965), Scottish artist
Frank Borland (1925–2013), Canadian soldier
Hal Borland (1900–1978), American journalist and author
James A. Borland (born 1944), American evangelical professor
Jeff Borland, Australian economist
Jimmy Borland (1910–1970), English professional ice hockey player
John Borland (born 1977), English footballer
John Borland (Scottish footballer) (born 1951), Scottish footballer
Johnny Borland (1925–1990), New Zealand high jumper and athletics administrator
Kevin Borland (1926–2000), Australian architect
Kyle Borland (born 1961), American football player
Polly Borland (born 1959), Australian photographer
Scott Borland (contemporary, born 1979), American musician
Solon Borland (1808–1864), American newspaperman and politician
Toby Borland (born 1969), American professional baseball player
Tom Borland (1933–2013), American professional baseball player
Tuf Borland (born 1998), American football player
W. S. Borland (1878–1959), American football and baseball coach
Wes Borland (born 1975), American musician and rock guitarist
William Borland (darts player) (born 1996), Scottish darts player
William Borland (loyalist) (1969–2016), Northern Irish former footballer
William Patterson Borland (1867–1919), American politician
Willie Borland (born 1952), Scottish footballer

Characters 
Al Borland, character on the American television series Home Improvement

See also 
 Borland (disambiguation)

References

Surnames of Scottish origin